Laiphognathus longispinis, the crown spotty blenny, is a species of combtooth blenny found in the northwest Pacific ocean. It can reach a maximum length of  SL.

References

longispinis
Fish described in 2007